Troy Lynne Nunley (born May 23, 1964) is a United States district judge of the United States District Court for the Eastern District of California.

Early life and education
Born in San Francisco, California, Nunley received his Bachelor of Arts degree in 1986 from St. Mary's College of California. He received his Juris Doctor in 1990 from University of California, Hastings College of the Law.

Career
Nunley served as a Deputy District Attorney in Alameda County from 1991 to 1994 and in Sacramento County from 1996 to 1999. He served in private practice as a solo practitioner from 1994 to 1996. He served as a Deputy Attorney General in the California Attorney General's office from 1999 to 2002. From 2002 to 2013, he served as a judge on the Sacramento County Superior Court. Nunley has served as a professor of Business Organizations at Lincoln Law School since 2006.

Federal judicial service
On June 25, 2012, President Barack Obama nominated Nunley to be a United States District Judge for the United States District Court for the Eastern District of California, to the seat vacated by Judge Garland Ellis Burrell Jr. who took senior status on July 4, 2012. On September 19, 2012, the Senate Judiciary Committee held a hearing on his nomination and reported his nomination to the floor on December 6, 2012, by voice vote. On January 2, 2013, his nomination was returned to the President, due to the sine die adjournment of the Senate. On January 3, 2013, he was renominated to the same office. His nomination was reported by the Senate Judiciary Committee on February 14, 2013, by voice vote. He was confirmed by voice vote on the legislative day of March 22, 2013. He received his commission on March 26, 2013.

See also 
 List of African-American federal judges
 List of African-American jurists

References

External links

1964 births
Living people
20th-century American lawyers
21st-century American judges
21st-century American lawyers
African-American judges
African-American lawyers
California state court judges
Judges of the United States District Court for the Eastern District of California
Lawyers from San Francisco
Lincoln Law School of Sacramento faculty
Saint Mary's College of California alumni
Superior court judges in the United States
United States district court judges appointed by Barack Obama
University of California, Hastings College of the Law alumni